The Voltaic Democratic Party–African Democratic Rally (PDV-RDA) was a political party in French Upper Volta.

History
The party was established as the Voltaic branch of the African Democratic Rally in 1946 by Djibril Vinama and Ali Barraud, supported by Daniel Ouezzin Coulibaly. It drew its support from young, educated residents of the western area of the territory who opposed the powers of the traditional chiefs.

In the Territorial Assembly elections in 1952 the party finished third to the Voltaic Union and the Rally of the French People.

In 1956 the party merged with the Social Party for the Emancipation of the African Masses to form the Unified Democratic Party.

References

Defunct political parties in Burkina Faso
Political parties established in 1948
Political parties disestablished in 1956